USCGC Spar (WLB-403) was a  sea going buoy tender. An Iris class vessel, she was built by Marine Ironworks and Shipbuilding Corporation in Duluth, Minnesota. Spar's preliminary design was completed by the United States Lighthouse Service and the final design was produced by Marine Iron and Shipbuilding. On 13 September 1943 the keel was laid, she was launched on 2 November 1943 and commissioned on 12 June 1944. The original cost for the hull and machinery was $865,941.

Spar was one of 39 original  seagoing buoy tenders built between 1942–1944. All of the seagoing buoy tenders were built in Duluth except .

Spar's most notable accomplishment was a mission to be the first vessels to circumnavigate North America along with sister ship  and the larger  from 18 May to 24 September 1957. Spar was the first vessel to circumnavigate the North American continent within one year. In 1966, nine years after the northwest passage mission, Spar was assigned a mission conducting oceanographic survey that included port calls at Iceland, Norway, Denmark, Germany, and Ireland.

Spar was decommissioned in 1997 and sold at auction. After changing hands several times, she ended up being transferred to the Northeastern Maritime Historical Foundation, who evaluated her and determined their best use of the ship was to sell her, or parts of her, to raise money to support their other projects. Spars main engines, generators, and other equipment were removed and sold to re-power another vessel.

References
Footnotes

Citations

References cited

External links
Northeastern Maritime Website

Iris-class seagoing buoy tenders
1943 ships
Ships built in Duluth, Minnesota
Ships sunk as artificial reefs
Shipwrecks of the Carolina coast